The 2015–16 North Dakota Fighting Hawks men's ice hockey team represented the University of North Dakota in the 2015–16 NCAA Division I men's ice hockey season. The Fighting Hawks were led by first-year head coach Brad Berry, replacing Dave Hakstol who became head coach of the Philadelphia Flyers. His assistant coaches were Dane Jackson, Matt Shaw, and Karl Goehring. The Fighting Hawks played their home games in Ralph Engelstad Arena and competed in the National Collegiate Hockey Conference.

Season
UND finished the regular season with a 28–5–3 record, winning the NCHC regular season title.  Seeded first in the NCHC Tournament, the Fighting Hawks swept the first-round series with Colorado College, before losing to Minnesota–Duluth in the semifinals.  UND entered the NCAA Tournament as the 3rd overall seed, and top seed in the Midwest Regional.  In the first round, they defeated Northeastern, and topped Big Ten champion Michigan in the regional final.  At the Frozen Four in Tampa, UND defeated conference foe and West Regional champion Denver on a Nick Schmaltz goal with 56 seconds remaining in regulation.  The Fighting Hawks faced Quinnipiac in the final, and easily won 5–1 to claim the school's 8th national championship and first since 2000.

Roster
As of December 5, 2015

Schedule

|-
!colspan=12 style=";" | Exhibition

|-
!colspan=12 style=";" | Regular Season

|-
!colspan=12 style=";" | 

|-
!colspan=12 style=";" |

Standings

Statistics
As of April 9, 2016

Skaters

Goaltenders

2016 championship game

MW1 North Dakota vs. E1 Quinnipiac

References

North Dakota Fighting Hawks men's ice hockey seasons
North Dakota
North Dakota
North Dakota
North Dakota
North Dakota
North Dakota